The 2021–22 season was Ulster Rugby's 28th season since the advent of professionalism in rugby union, and Dan McFarland's fourth season as head coach. They competed in the inaugural United Rugby Championship (successor competition to the Pro14) and the European Rugby Champions Cup.

The major new signing was South African number eight Duane Vermeulen. Ulster finished third in the URC, and second in the Irish Shield, qualifying for the playoffs and for next season's Champions Cup. They beat Munster at home in the quarter-final, but went out in the semi-final to the Stormers in Cape Town. Lock Alan O'Connor won the URC Tackle Machine award, and flanker Nick Timoney and centre James Hume were named in the league's Dream Team. Ulster won all four of their pool games in the Champions Cup, finishing second and qualifying for a two-legged round of sixteen playoff against Toulouse, which they lost by an aggregate score of 49-50. Fullback Michael Lowry was nominated for European Player of the Year and made his debut for Ireland. James Hume was Ulster's Player of the Year.

Ulster used 46 players this season, compared to Leinster with 60, Munster with 59 and Connacht with 46. Alan O'Connor, Billy Burns and Nick Timoney made the most appearances for the province, each appearing in 24 out of 26 games. Robert Baloucoune was top try scorer with 11. Nick Timoney was RTÉ's choice for Ulster's player of the season, and Andrew Warwick was their most underrated player. Nathan Doak had a breakthrough season, deputising for the injured John Cooney as scrum-half and goal kicker, and finishing the season the team's leading scorer with 132 points.

Events

Pre-season
Former assistant coach Dwayne Peel left in the off-season to become head coach of Scarlets. Skills coach Dan Soper was promoted to assistant, and Craig Newby joined as the new skills coach. Gavin Hogg, formerly rugby development officer, became the new academy manager, assisted by Willie Faloon as elite performance development officer.

After the departure of Marcell Coetzee last season, Ulster attempted to sign Fijian forward Leone Nakarawa, but the move fell through following a medical report. As the season began, Ulster announced the signing of South African number 8 Duane Vermeulen, who would join the squad in November after the autumn internationals. Other new arrivals were lock Mick Kearney, signed from Zebre Parma, and hooker Declan Moore, signed from Munster as short-term injury cover. Departing were hooker Adam McBurney to Edinburgh, Matt Faddes to Otago, and out-half Bill Johnston to Ealing Trailfinders, making his loan move last season permanent. Fullback Louis Ludik retired. Scrum-half Alby Mathewson and prop Kyle McCall were released, and academy centre Hayden Hyde moved to Harlequins' academy.

Lock Iain Henderson was selected for the 2021 British & Irish Lions tour to South Africa. He didn't play in any of the tests, but made four appearances, including starting against Japan and captaining the side against the Sharks. Centre James Hume, wing Robert Baloucoune and flanker Nick Timoney all made their Ireland debuts in the summer international against the United States in July, and uncapped fullback Michael Lowry trained with the Ireland squad for the summer internationals.

Ulster played two friendlies, home and away, against Saracens. The home match was played at the Kingspan on 3 September 2021, the away match at the Honourable Artillery Company grounds in London on 9 September 2021.

Season
Ulster won their first four matches of the URC season. Hooker Bradley Roberts made his first competitive start, and scored a try in the season opener at home to Glasgow Warriors. Scrum-half John Cooney went off injured in the first half, replaced by 19-year-old Nathan Doak, who scored a try and three conversions. With Cooney missing, Doak started in the away win against Zebre Parma and the home wins against Benetton and Lions, and continued to impress. Hooker Rob Herring made his 200th appearance for Ulster against Benetton. Fullback Will Addison sustained a fracture to his lower leg in the October match against the Lions. Ulster's winning run was halted by a defeat away to Connacht at the Aviva Stadium on 23 October.

Club competition then took a break for the Autumn internationals. Lock Iain Henderson came on as a replacement for Ireland in the 60-5 win over Japan, and started in the 29-20 victory over New Zealand , with hooker Rob Herring coming off the bench. Henderson and wing Robert Baloucoune started, with prop Tom O'Toole and flanker Nick Timoney coming off the bench, in the 53-7 win against Argentina. Centres James Hume and Stuart McCloskey were named in the 38-man squad, but did not make an appearance.  Hooker Bradley Roberts was called up for Wales, and made his international debut from the bench against South Africa.

After the break, John Cooney returned to action for a 20-10 away win over Leinster, with the back row of Marcus Rea, Nick Timoney and David McCann impressing, but this was followed by a disappointing away loss to Ospreys, in which wing Craig Gilroy made his 200th appearance for Ulster.

Having been awarded development contracts at the start of the season, scrum-half Nathan Doak and wing Ethan McIlroy signed long-term senior contracts in December - Doak for four years, McIlroy for three.

It was announced that Former head coach Neil Doak would return to Ulster as elite player development officer for the academy in early 2022.

Ulster opened their Champions Cup season on 11 December with an away win against Clermont, which marked Duane Vermeulen's debut for the province. The following weekend they defeated Northampton Saints at home, with fullback Michael Lowry scoring two tries. The next two scheduled URC matches, Interpros at home to Connacht on 26 December and Leinster on 1 January, were postponed because of Covid-19 cases. Ulster's next game was a tight away defeat to Munster, before the Champions Cup resumed with an away win against Northampton Saints, which marked Nathan Doak's first European start, and a home win against Clermont, in which Ulster built up a 22-point lead before Clermont almost pulled it back with three late tries. These four pool victories earned Ulster a two-legged round of 16 tie against reigning champions Toulouse.

Robert Baloucoune, James Hume, Michael Lowry, Iain Henderson, Rob Herring, Tom O'Toole and Nick Timoney were called up to the Ireland squad for the 2022 Six Nations Championship on 19 January. Bradley Roberts was called up for Wales. A depleted Ulster side, missing most of their internationals, defeated Scarlets at home on 28 January. Wing Craig Gilroy, who received a yellow card for a dangerous tackle during the game, was later cited and banned for four matches. The home tie against Connacht was rescheduled for 4 February, on the eve of Ireland's opening match of the Six Nations against Wales. Robert Baloucoune, Michael Lowry and Nick Timoney, who had not been selected for that game, were temporarily released from the Ireland camp back to Ulster. Baloucoune and Lowry started, Timoney came off the bench, and Baloucoune scored two tries, in a 32-12 victory. Hooker Declan Moore, who had joined Ulster as short-term injury cover from Munster, and had just agreed to a permanent move next season, unexpectedly made his debut after a last-minute injury to John Andrew, and scored a try. The following day, James Hume came off the bench in Ireland's 29-7 victory over Wales.

Fullback Michael Lowry was named on the long list for EPCR European Player of the Year for the 2021-22 season, and made his debut for Ireland against Italy in the Six Nations on 27 February 2022.

In February, lock David O'Connor joined Ealing Trailfinders until the end of the season, and academy centre Jude Postlethwaite signed a development contract, to be upgraded to a full senior contract after a year. Academy scrum-half Lewis Finlay signed for English Championship club Ampthill.

Having beaten Leinster away in November, Ulster completed a rare double by defeating them at home on a rainy night in March. They then travelled to South Africa, losing narrowly to the Stormers in Cape Town after a late try by Callum Reid, which would have put Ulster ahead, was disallowed after TMO review. URC head of officials Tappe Henning later admitted the try should have stood. Alan O'Connor made his 150th appearance for Ulster against the Stormers. The following week, against the Bulls in Pretoria, Andrew Warwick made his 150th appearance as Ulster fell to a 34-16 defeat. The trip to South Africa saw centre Luke Marshall return to action after 16 months out with a knee injury. He came off the bench against the Stormers, and started, and scored, against the Bulls.

Ulster won the away leg of their Champions Cup round of 16 tie against Toulouse 26-20, with Robert Baloucoune scoring a hat-trick after Toulouse wing Juan Cruz Mallia was shown an early red card. Taking a six-point lead into the second leg at home, they lost 30-23, going out of the competition 49-50 on aggregate. Flanker Nick Timoney made his 100th appearance for the province in the second leg.

Former Springboks and Ulster flanker Pedrie Wannenburg was killed in a car accident in Texas in April.

In the wake of the defeat at home to Toulouse, Ulster suffered their first home loss in the URC, at home to Munster. The followinging week, they ended their losing run by inflicting a first home league defeat on Edinburgh in a close contest, confirming their qualification for the quarter-finals. Two weeks later, they secured a home quarter-final by defeating the Sharks at home. They defeated Munster in the quarter-final at Ravenhill on 3 June, earning a semi-final away to the Stormers.

Alan O'Connor won the URC Tackle Machine award for the 2021-22 season, after making 195 tackles with a 97.5% success rate in that competition. Flanker Nick Timoney and centre James Hume were named in the URC Dream Team.

Future
Signings reported for next season include:
Irish-qualified flanker Sean Reffell from Saracens.
Hooker Declan Moore, who initially joined from Munster as short-term injury cover, has signed with Ulster for the next two seasons.
Lock Frank Bradshaw Ryan from French club Nevers.
Fullback Shea O'Brien from City of Armagh RFC, on a development contract.
Out-half Jake Flannery from Munster.
Tighthead prop Jeffery Toomaga-Allen from Wasps

Departures next season include:
Defence coach Jared Payne will leave at the end of the season. Former Ulster and Ireland centre, and current Worcester Warriors defence coach, Jonny Bell, will replace him.
Hooker Bradley Roberts to Dragons.
Prop Jack McGrath, flanker Sean Reidy and locks David O'Connor and Mick Kearney (released).
Prop Ross Kane to Ealing Trailfinders.

Staff

Squad

Senior squad

Players in
 Mick Kearney from  Zebre Parma (short-term deal)
 Duane Vermeulen from  Bulls
 Declan Moore from  Munster (short-term loan)
 Aaron Sexton promoted from Academy
 Nathan Doak promoted from Academy
 Tom Stewart promoted from Academy
 Ethan McIlroy promoted from Academy
 Callum Reid promoted from Academy
 David McCann promoted from Academy
 Cormac Izuchukwu promoted from Academy
 Ben Moxham promoted from Academy

Players out
 Adam McBurney to  Edinburgh
 Alby Mathewson released
 Kyle McCall released 
 Matt Faddes to  Otago
 Bill Johnston to  Ealing Trailfinders

Academy squad

Players in
 James Humphreys from Gloucester academy
 Jude Postlethwaite from RBAI
 Conor McKee from Sullivan Upper School
 George Saunderson from Sullivan Upper School
 Harry Sheridan from Sullivan Upper School.

Players out
 Hayden Hyde to  Harlequins academy
 Bruce Houston to  Heriot's Rugby Club

2021–22 European Rugby Champions Cup

Pool stage

Round of 16

2021–22 United Rugby Championship

Quarter-final

Semi-final

Ulster 'A'

Home attendance

Awards
The Ulster Rugby Awards were announced online on 23 June 2022. Winners were:

Bank of Ireland Ulster Rugby Personality of the Year: Ashleigh Orchard
Heineken Men's Player of the Year: James Hume (nominees: Robert Baloucoune, Michael Lowry, Nick Timoney, Andrew Warwick)
Deloitte Women's Player of the Year: Aishling O'Connell, Cooke RFC (nominees: Keelin Brady, Railway Union RFC; Beth Cregan, Cooke RFC; Kelly McCormill, Cooke RFC; Fiona Tuite, Old Belvedere RFC)
Ulster Rugby Supporters Club Player of the Year: Michael Lowry
Rugby Writers' Player of the Year: James Hume (nominees: Robert Baloucoune, Michael Lowry, Nick Timoney)
Openreach Young Men's Player of the Year: Ethan McIlroy (nominees: Nathan Doak, Ben Moxham)
Deloitte Young Women's Player of the Year: Jorja Battishill, Malone RFC (nominees: Sophie Barrett, Enniskillen RFC; Rachael McIlroy, Queen's University RFC; Fern Wilson, Malone RFC)
Kukri Club of the Year: Queen's University RFC (nominees: Ballymena RFC, Ballynahinch RFC, Virginia RFC)
Ken Goodall Club Player of the Year: David Whitten, Queen's University RFC (nominees: Michael Orr, Queen's University RFC; Shea O'Brien, City of Armagh RFC)
Dorrington B. Faulker (Services to Rugby) Award: Anne Scott, Inishowen RFC president
Referee of the Year: Chris Busby
Deloitte U18 Girls' Player of the Year: Sadhbh McGrath, City of Derry RFC (nominees: Farrah Cartin-McCloskey, Enniskillen RFC; Sarah Shrestha, Loughborough University)
Ulster Carpets Boys' Youth Player of the Year: Ethan Graham, Monaghan RFC/Belfast Met RFC (nominees: Michael Burnett, City of Armagh RFC; Mark Lee, Rainey Old Boys R.F.C.)
Danske Bank Girls' Schools Player of the Year: Sophie Barrett, Erne Integrated College (nominees: Moya Hill, Erne Integrated College; Zara Hutchinson, Enniskillen Royal Grammar School)
Danske Bank Boys' Schools Player of the Year: Joe Hopes, Campbell College (nominees: Ben McFarlane, Methodist College Belfast; Josh Stevens, Methodist College Belfast)

References

2021-22
2021–22 in Irish rugby union
2021–22 United Rugby Championship by team
2021–22 European Rugby Champions Cup by team